Richard White is a paralympic athlete from Great Britain competing mainly in category T35 sprint events.

Richard has competed twice in the 100m and 200m at the paralympics.  In 2000, he won two bronze medals, a feat he was unable to achieve in 2004 where he did not win any medals.

References

Paralympic athletes of Great Britain
Athletes (track and field) at the 2000 Summer Paralympics
Athletes (track and field) at the 2004 Summer Paralympics
Paralympic bronze medalists for Great Britain
Living people
Medalists at the 2000 Summer Paralympics
Year of birth missing (living people)
Paralympic medalists in athletics (track and field)
British male sprinters